Aidan Riley is a former professional Australian rules footballer who played for the Adelaide Football Club and Melbourne Football Club in the Australian Football League (AFL). He initially joined  in 2011 via the NSW scholarship program, before joining  as a delisted free agent in November 2013. He made his debut in 2011, against  in Showdown XXXI.

He was delisted at the conclusion of the 2015 season.

Statistics

|- style="background-color: #EAEAEA"
! scope="row" style="text-align:center" | 2011
|style="text-align:center;"|
| 43 || 5 || 1 || 2 || 15 || 18 || 33 || 8 || 12 || 0.2 || 0.4 || 3.0 || 3.6 || 6.6 || 1.6 || 2.4 || 0
|- 
! scope="row" style="text-align:center" | 2012
|style="text-align:center;"|
| 43 || 5 || 3 || 0 || 29 || 26 || 55 || 12 || 13 || 0.6 || 0.0 || 5.8 || 5.2 || 11.0 || 2.4 || 2.6 || 0
|- style="background:#eaeaea;"
! scope="row" style="text-align:center" | 2013
|style="text-align:center;"|
| 43 || 2 || 1 || 0 || 6 || 8 || 14 || 3 || 0 || 0.5 || 0.0 || 3.0 || 4.0 || 7.0 || 1.5 || 0.0 || 0
|- 
! scope="row" style="text-align:center" | 2014
|style="text-align:center;"|
| 27 || 9 || 3 || 5 || 42 || 58 || 100 || 14 || 31 || 0.3 || 0.6 || 4.7 || 6.4 || 11.1 || 1.6 || 3.4 || 0
|- style="background:#eaeaea;"
! scope="row" style="text-align:center" | 2015
|style="text-align:center;"|
| 27 || 4 || 0 || 0 || 11 || 25 || 36 || 11 || 5 || 0.0 || 0.0 || 2.7 || 6.3 || 9.0 || 2.8 || 1.5 || 0
|- class="sortbottom"
! colspan=3| Career
! 25
! 8
! 7
! 103
! 135
! 238
! 48
! 61
! 0.3
! 0.3
! 4.1
! 5.4
! 9.5
! 1.9
! 2.4
! 0
|}

References

External links

Aidan Riley's profile from DemonWiki

1991 births
Living people
Adelaide Football Club players
Melbourne Football Club players
Sturt Football Club players
Casey Demons players
Australian rules footballers from New South Wales